Osama Mohammed Ahmed Khalil, known as Ossama Khalil (born 5 February 1954) is a retired Egyptian footballer. He played at both professional and international levels as a striker.

Career
Khalil played club football for Ismaily in Egypt, before moving to the United States, where he played in the North American Soccer League for the Philadelphia Fury and the California Surf.

Khalil also played at international level for Egypt.

References

External links

Ossama Khalil - Official website

1954 births
Living people
Egyptian footballers
Egyptian expatriate footballers
Egypt international footballers
1974 African Cup of Nations players
1976 African Cup of Nations players
Philadelphia Fury (1978–1980) players
California Surf players
North American Soccer League (1968–1984) players
Expatriate soccer players in the United States
Egyptian expatriate sportspeople in the United States
Competitors at the 1975 Mediterranean Games
Competitors at the 1979 Mediterranean Games
Sportspeople from Port Said
Association football forwards
Mediterranean Games competitors for Egypt
20th-century Egyptian people
21st-century Egyptian people